This article is about lesbian, gay, bisexual and transgender (LGBT) history in France.

Prior to 1600 
10,000 years BC — Around the end of Paleolithic, humanity started to make artifacts which suggest an appreciation of homosexual eroticism. Some examples, like graffiti, can be seen in some cave and hundreds of buildings and phallic statues and also a carved double dildo, seen as evidence for female masturbation found at Gorge d'Enfere, France.
1100 – Ivo of Chartres tries to convince Pope Urban II about homosexuality risks. Ivo accused Rodolfo, archbishop of Tours, of convincing the King of France to appoint a certain Giovanni as bishop of Orléans. Giovanni was well known as Rodolfo's lover and had relations with the king himself, a fact of which the king openly boasted. Pope Urban, however, did not consider this as a decisive fact. Giovanni ruled as bishop for almost forty years, and Rodolfo continued to be well known and respected.
 1260 – In France, first-offending sodomites lost their testicles, second offenders lost their member, and third offenders were burned. Women caught in same-sex acts could be mutilated and executed as well.
 1283 – The Coutumes de Beauvaisis dictated that convicted sodomites were burned and had their property forfeited.

1600–1800 

1779 – Written on July 21, 1776, the Letter LXIII became infamous for its discussion of homosexuality. Mathieu-François Pidansat de Mairobert published the letter in his 1779 book, "L’Espion Anglois, Ou Correspondance Secrete Entre Milord All’eye et Milord Alle’ar" (aka "L’Observateur Anglais or L’Espion Anglais") ("The English Spy, or Secret Correspondence Between my Lord and my Lord All'eye Alle'ar" [aka "The English Observer or the English Spy"]).
1783 – Honoré Gabriel Riqueti, Comte de Mirabeau discusses homosexuality in his Erotika Biblion.
1789 – François-Rolland Elluin engraves an image of God's wrath against the homosexuals. Elluin engraved the image for the Liberté Opera's Le Pot-Pourri de Loth in Les Hymnes et les Potpourri.
 1791 – Revolutionary France (and Andorra) adopts a new penal code which no longer criminalizes sodomy. France thus becomes the first Western European country to decriminalize homosexual acts between consenting adults.

19th century 
 1832 – an age of consent is introduced on 28 April, fixed to 11 years for both sexes.
1857 – Dr. Auguste Ambroise Tardieu mentions homosexuality in Attentats aux moeurs.
 1863 – Age of consent is raised to 13 years.
 1866 – Gustave Doré's illustrations for La Grande Bible de Tours features Image 13, "The Flight of Lot," in reference to the biblical story of Sodom.

20th century

1900–1960 

 1906 – Édouard-Henri "Paul" Avril publishes the pornographic book, De Figuris Venurus, complete with plate prints of sex acts throughout ancient history.
 1907 – Édouard-Henri "Paul" Avril provides erotic illustration including a lesbian image, for a republication of the novel, Fanny Hill.
 1907 – Georges Méliès' The Eclipse, or the Courtship of the Sun and Moon (L'éclipse du soleil en pleine lune) features a potentially humorous scene with the personification of the sun and the moon in gay sexual practices, possibly analingus.
 1924 - Inversions, the first French magazine for homosexuals, is founded. Due to strong prosecution, it had to stop its publication in early 1925 after only four issues.

 During World War II - Ovida Delect, a transgender woman, poet, and communist activist, was deported to a German concentration camp for her work with the French Resistance. In June 2019 Paris named a square Ovida Delect square for her.
 1942 – On 6 August, the Vichy government introduced a discriminative law in penal code: article 334 (moved to article 331 on 8 February 1945 by the Provisional Government of the French Republic) increased the age of consent to 21 for homosexual relations and 15 for heterosexual ones.
 1954 – Arcadie Club, the first homosexual group in France, is formed by André Baudry.
1954 - Transgender painter Michel Marie Poulain publishes her autobiography J'ai choisi mon sexe (I chose my sex), contributing to the general public knowledge and visibility of transgender identity.
 1960 – Article 330, 2nd alinea, a clause that doubled the penalty for indecent exposure for homosexual activity, was inserted into the penal code.

1960–1990 
 1971 – The first attempt at forming a gay male parade contingency took place during the traditional trade union march May Day, despite objections from the Central Confederation of Labour to what the organization described as a "tradition alien to the working class". The same year, the leftist-oriented Front homosexuel d'action révolutionnaire was organized, initiating a number of upstagings of various institutions in order to draw attention to the legal plight of homosexuals in French society and combat heterosexism.
 1974 – After being denied access to the Museum of Fine Arts (the traditional meeting place), the FHAR gradually ceased to exist. They were succeeded by a number of groups known as the Groupe de libération homosexuelle, which organized film viewings and journal publications.
 1979 – the Euro-Mediterranean Summer Universities for Homosexuals are established, leading to the establishment in the same year of CUARH.
 1981 – On April 4, CUARH organized the largest demonstration for the reform of the age of consent in Paris, resulting in a promise by president François Mitterrand to do so the following year.
 1982 – France equalizes the age of consent; CUARH leads the first pride parade in French history in Paris.
 1983 – Composer Claude Vivier is attacked and later murdered in Paris as the result of a homophobic hate crime, becoming a cause célèbre across Europe.
 1985 – France prohibits discrimination based on lifestyle (mœurs) in employment and services.

1990–1999 
 1998 – André Labarrère becomes first member of Parliament to come out as gay.
 1999 – Pacte civil de solidarité legalizes a form of domestic partnership; the organizing committee for Gay Pride in Paris is dissolved due to high amounts of debt, and replaced with Inter-LGBT.

21st century 

 2011 – A bill to legalize same-sex marriage in France is defeated in conservative (UMP) majority National Assembly.
 2013 – Despite protests by anti-gay marriage groups, the law to legalize same-sex marriage is voted by the National Assembly and Senate which currently has a Socialist (Francois Hollande) majority. The bill passed 331–225 in the National Assembly and 171–165 in the Senate. President Francois Hollande promulgated the bill, which was officially published on 18 May 2013.
 2020 - The engineer Marie Cau is elected (in March) and inaugurated (in May, after a delay due to the COVID-19 pandemic) as mayor of Tilloy-lez-Marchiennes, making her the first openly transgender mayor in France.

See also 
 LGBT rights in France
 LGBT culture in Paris

References